Shell Bluff is an unincorporated community in Burke County, in the U.S. state of Georgia.

History
A post office called Shell Bluff was established in 1889, and remained in operation until 1913. The community was named for a nearby fossil bed on the Savannah River. The Vogtle Electric Generating Plant is located near the area.

References

Unincorporated communities in Georgia (U.S. state)
Unincorporated communities in Burke County, Georgia